The 2008 FIBA Africa Under-18 Championship for Men (alternatively the Afrobasket U18) was the 16th edition, organized by FIBA Africa and played under the auspices of the Fédération Internationale de Basketball, the basketball sport governing body and the African zone thereof. The tournament was held from October 17–26 in Alexandria, Egypt and won by Egypt.

The tournament qualified both the winner and the runner-up for the 2009 Under-19 World Cup.

Format
The 12 teams were divided into two groups (Groups A+B) for the preliminary round.
Round robin for the preliminary round; the top four teams from each group advanced to the quarterfinals.
From there on a knockout system was used until the final.

Squads

Draw

Preliminary round

Group A

Group B

Knockout stage 
Championship bracket

5-8th bracket

9-12th bracket

9–12th classification

Quarterfinals

11th place

9th place

Classification 5–8

Semifinals

7th place

5th place

Bronze medal game

Gold medal game

Final standings

Egypt rosterAdham Elsayed, Aly Mohamed, Amr Abdelkader, Amr Gendy, Hady Elbeltagy, Moamen Mobarak, Mohamed Desouky, Motaz Okasha, Moustafa Hany, Omar Oraby, Ramy Hosny, Zyad Mohamed Coach:

All Tournament Team

Statistical Leaders

Individual Tournament Highs

Points

Rebounds

Assists

Steals

Blocks

Turnovers

2-point field goal percentage

3-point field goal percentage

Free throw percentage

Individual Game Highs

Team Tournament Highs

Points

Rebounds

Assists

Steals

Blocks

Turnovers

2-point field goal percentage

3-point field goal percentage

Free throw percentage

Team Game highs

See also
 2009 FIBA Africa Championship

External links
Official Website

References

2008 in African basketball
2008 in Egyptian sport
International basketball competitions hosted by Egypt
2008 in youth sport